Comic House (formerly Chapterhouse) is a Canadian comic publishing company that publishes books featuring classic Canadian comic book characters such as Captain Canuck and Northguard in a unified comic book universe under Lev Gleason.

Characters
Comic House publishes the following characters, comics, and books under the Lev Gleason banner:

Captain Canuck

Fantomah

Captain Battle

Silver Streak

Northguard

Daredevil

Crimebuster

Freelance

Imprints

Comic House Archives 
The Comic House archives celebrate the rich history of both Chapterhouse and Lev Gleason Publications, releasing past popular issues for the next generation. Titles include:

Captain Canuck (1975)

Beyond: The Quest for Medan (1980)

The Deadly Dozen

The Claw

New Friday 
New Friday is an independently curated imprint home for 100% creator-owned books and graphic novels, with many titles available for print and online through the app such as:

The Fourth Planet

Minerva’s Map 

HΩME 

51 Hundred

Celery Stalks

Life, Death, and Sorcery

Frogboy

Scratcher

Blood and Motor Oil

1903 ManHunt

Red Leaves

Eki 

Upcoming titles:  

Pieces of Hate

Frankenaut

Fantomeque

Nash

Lev Gleason Library 
The Lev Gleason Library releases published novels and other prose. Death Takes Center Stage by DK Latta, featuring Daredevil, was released April 2021, and The “I” of The Needle, a Captain Canuck novel by DK Latta, was also available in early 2021.

References

2015 establishments in Ontario
Comic book publishing companies of Canada
Companies based in Toronto